Top Model was a French reality television series based on America's Next Top Model.

Show format

Challenges
The challenges usually focused on an element important to modeling. A guest judge, who was unique to each episode, evaluated the contestants and decided the winner of the challenge, who received a prize for her victory. The winner was then permitted to allow a certain number of other contestants to receive a similar, but lesser, reward, while the others were given nothing.

Judging and elimination
Based on the contestants' performance in the week's challenge, photoshoot, and general attitude, the judges deliberated and decided which girl must leave the competition. Once the judges made their decision, the contestants were called back into the room. The host called out the names of the contestants who were not eliminated, giving them a copy of their best photo from the shoot. The last two contestants left standing were given criticism, and one was eliminated.

Cycles

External links
 Top Model 2005 M6 Official Site (Wayback Machine)
 Top Model 2007 M6 Official Site (defunct)

France
French reality television series
2005 French television series debuts
2007 French television series endings
French television series based on American television series
French fashion